
Gmina Bliżyn is a rural gmina (administrative district) in Skarżysko County, Świętokrzyskie Voivodeship, in south-central Poland.

The gmina contains part of the protected area called Suchedniów-Oblęgorek Landscape Park.

Villages
Gmina Bliżyn contains the villages and settlements of Bliżyn, Brzeście, Bugaj, Drożdżów, Gilów, Górki, Gostków, Jastrzębia, Kopcie, Kucębów, Mroczków, Nowki, Nowy Odrowążek, Odrowążek, Płaczków, Rędocin, Sobótka, Sołtyków, Sorbin, Ubyszów, Wojtyniów, Wołów, Zagórze and Zbrojów.

Neighbouring gminas
Gmina Bliżyn is bordered by the town of Skarżysko-Kamienna and by the gminas of Chlewiska, Łączna, Stąporków, Suchedniów, Szydłowiec and Zagnańsk.

References
Polish official population figures 2006

Blizyn
Skarżysko County